Victor of Braga (died ), also known as Saint Victor, was a Portuguese Christian martyr.
His feast day is 12 April.

Sources

Victor's very existence has frequently been refuted. 
His story is based on the Breviary of Braga, which was credulous enough to admit all of the forgeries of "Julian Perez", the alleged eleventh century priest of Toledo.
However, a short passion from the Abbey of Santo Domingo de Silos in the Province of Burgos, written at the end of the 11th century, could reflect an ancient tradition.
It says that Victor met one day with the procession that accompanied the image of a pagan god and that, confessing himself a Christian, he was sentenced to death and beheaded.

Monks of Ramsgate account

The monks of St Augustine's Abbey, Ramsgate wrote in their Book of Saints (1921),

Butler's account

The hagiographer Alban Butler (1710–1773) wrote in his Lives of the Fathers, Martyrs, and Other Principal Saints under April 12,

Notes

Sources

 

 

Portuguese Roman Catholic saints
300 deaths